Yeasin Arafat (born 5 January 2003) is a Bangladeshi professional footballer who plays as a left back. He currently plays for Bashundhara Kings and the Bangladesh national team. He also plays for the Bangladesh national under-23 team and captains the Bangladesh national under-19 team. He is known in his country for offensive playing style & skills.

Club career

Kadamtola Sangsad
In 2017, Yeasin started his senior club career with Kadamtola Sangsad in Dhaka Third Division Football League (overall 5th tier). His outstanding performance and potential earned him a contract from top-tier side Saif SC.

Saif SC
Yeasin started his journey in top tier from 2018-19 season with Saif SC. On 19 January 2019, He made his Bangladesh Premier League debut against Rahmatganj. The debutant registered an assist in this match, resulting in a 2-1 win. In the debut season, He made 4 assists in 23 league appearances without conceding a single card. In 2019-20 BPL, he scored 2 goals with 1 assist in 6 appearances.

In 2019, it was revealed that Saif SC tagged Yeasin Arafat with a release clause of 1 crore taka (0.12 million USD), making him the Bangladeshi player with the highest release clause.

Bashundhara Kings
On 25 November 2021, Yeasin joined Bashundhara Kings.

International career

Youth teams
Yeasin represented Bangladesh U-16, Bangladesh U-19 and Bangladesh U-23 in international levels. He scored total 4 international goals for Bangladesh U-16 and Bangladesh U-23. He was captain of Bangladesh in 2019 SAFF U-18 Championship and 2020 AFC U-19 Championship qualification.

Senior team
Yeasin made his debut for Bangladesh national team on October 3, 2019, against Bhutan in a FIFA friendly match. Bangladesh won the match by 2-0.
He scored a goal against India in 2021 SAFF Championship.

Career statistics

Club 

Notes

International

International goals

U-16 team
Scores and results list Bangladesh's goal tally first.

U-19 team
Scores and results list Bangladesh's goal tally first.

Senior team
Scores and results list Bangladesh's goal tally first.

References

External links 

2003 births
Living people
Footballers from Dhaka
Bangladeshi footballers
Bangladesh international footballers
Bangladesh youth international footballers
Association football fullbacks
Saif SC players
Bashundhara Kings players